KRET may refer to:

 KRET-CD, a low-power television station (channel 31, virtual channel 45) licensed to Cathedral City, California, United States
 KRET-TV, a defunct television station (channel 23) in Richardson, Texas, United States
 Concern Radio-Electronic Technologies, a Russian defense company

See also